Michelle Meier Keller (born 1960) is an American judge and lawyer, who has been a justice of the Kentucky Supreme Court since 2013.

Keller was born and raised in Fort Mitchell, Kentucky. She attended Northern Kentucky University, where she completed an associate's degree in nursing in 1980, a Bachelor of Science degree in 1985, and a J.D. degree in 1990, at the Salmon P. Chase College of Law.

Keller worked in private practice as a criminal defense lawyer, and as an assistant county prosecutor. She was elected as a state judge on the Kentucky Court of Appeals for the 6th appellate district in November 2006, defeating rival Owen Kennedy by 63% to 37%.

The Governor of Kentucky Steve Beshear appointed Keller to the Supreme Court of Kentucky in April 2013, to replace retired justice Wilfrid Schroder. Keller represents the 6th Supreme Court district, which covers 21 counties in Northern Kentucky. 
She was re-elected to a new eight-year term in November 2014, defeating challenger Teresa Cunningham by 58% to 42%. In 2022, Keller won an election challenge by Joseph Fischer. Her current term expires on January 1, 2031.

The honors Keller has received include a Donated Legal Services Award from the Kentucky Bar Association in 2009 for her pro bono work, was named Outstanding Woman of Northern Kentucky in 2012, received the Richard D. Lawrence Lifetime Achievement Award from the Northern Kentucky Bar Association in 2013 and the Liberty Bell Award in 2014, the Distinguished Lawyer of the Year Award in 2017, and received a Distinguished Judge Award in 2020.

References

1960 births
Living people
Justices of the Kentucky Supreme Court
Northern Kentucky University alumni
Salmon P. Chase College of Law alumni
21st-century American judges
21st-century American women judges